Pâté chinois ('Chinese pie') is a French Canadian dish similar to the English shepherd's pie or French hachis Parmentier. It is a traditional recipe in both Québécois cuisine and Acadian cuisine.

Ingredients

The dish is made with layered ground beef (sometimes mixed with sautéed diced onions) on the bottom, canned corn (either whole-kernel, creamed, or a mixture) for the middle layer, and mashed potatoes on top. Seasonings may be added to the top. Variations may include reversing the layering of ingredients with potatoes at the bottom, then meat, topped with creamed corn; adding diced bell peppers to the ground beef; and serving the dish with pickled eggs or beets. Once served, ketchup can be added.

Origins 
There are no confirmed appearances of pâté chinois before the 1930s. This has led many to believe it was created in the 1930s, but its origins are widely debated and there are multiple hypotheses.

All current theories are rejected by Jean-Pierre Lemasson, author of the book Le mystère insondable du pâté chinois. According to his research, Chinese workers simply ate rice and soybeans during the construction of the Canadian Pacific Railway (ruling out the Railway Hypothesis). In addition, he notes that pâté chinois had only appeared on the tables of Quebecois families in the 1930s, which makes it difficult to believe that it appeared during the industrial revolution in Maine (ruling out the South China Hypothesis). According to this author, the origin of pâté chinois remains a mystery.

Railway Hypothesis
This hypothesis suggests that pâté chinois came into existence at the end of the 19th century during the construction of the Canadian Pacific Railway. At the time, railway workers, mostly of Asian origin, were said to be fed on the job with only ground beef, potatoes and corn as these ingredients were readily available and inexpensive at the time. While working on the railway, these workers created, by force of circumstance, a unique blend, named pâté chinois in their honour. French Canadian railway workers would have adopted this new dish shortly thereafter.

South China Hypothesis
Another hypothesis suggests that this dish originated from the city of South China in Maine. Many French Canadians had emigrated there to find work during the industrial revolution. The “China pie”, a local specialty, would have become popular among the French Canadians and been translated into pâté chinois.

Pemmican Hypothesis
Some believe that pâté chinois might have evolved from pemmican.

European cuisine took a long time to develop dishes of the 'potato-topped hash' type. It had first to assimilate as ingredients both potato and minced beef. The discovery of America would open up yet more vistas in cookery and push farther the boundaries of culinary geography; for, while Europe concocted its own version of the dish, here in America, we married "pemmican" (corn and meat) with minced meat from the Old World. This combination gave rise to the modern pâté chinois. As such, in the context of traditional oven-baked dishes, pâté chinois should be classified, approved and protected by the Ministry of Cultural Affairs.

-translated from Du pâté chinois by B. Arcand and S. Bouchard (p. 15).

La Salle's Failed Expedition Hypothesis
In his Genesis of Quebec cuisine, published by Editions Fides, Jean-Marie Francœur goes further. He argues that the famous name "pâté chinois", the origin of which remains obscure despite the popularity of the dish, could be linked to a missed expedition.

In 1669, René-Robert Cavelier de La Salle settled in New France at the foot of the fiery rapids of the Sault Saint-Louis in Ville-Marie (now called Montreal). La Salle's dream, even his obsession, was to find the passage west to the "Vermeille Sea" -what he called the Pacific Ocean- to reach China. Two Native Americans, it seems, had told him about this passage, and he liked to remind anyone who wanted to hear it. He did not want to leave to any other "the honor of finding the way to the South Sea and by extension China". Selling his land in Ville-Marie, he set out at the head of a flotilla of 14 men and a few canoes. Contrary to what he had suggested, he did not speak the language of the Iroquois nor that of the Algonquins. He was unable to use a compass and had no knowledge of survival in the forest. The crew members had a difficult time reaching Lake Ontario, to say the least. Once there, one of the crew members informed La Salle about a nearby Amerindian nation, the Potawatomi, telling him they had not been evangelized yet. Feeling burned out, La Salle pretended to feel sick and quickly returned to Ville-Marie. There, he claimed to everyone that he explored Ohio and discovered the Mississippi.

At Coste Saint-Sulpice (now called Lachine), people witnessed the return of this crew, equipped to be gone for months, return barely a few weeks after they left. Many wondered if "China" was actually closer to Ville-Marie than they had previously thought. This would make "China" very close to Coste Saint-Sulpice. It was thought that perhaps people got into the habit of referring to Coste Saint-Sulpice as "China", hence resulting in its change of name from Coste Saint-Sulpice to Lachine. Moreover, La Salle's men had eaten corn during their entire expedition, and, according to Francœur, the iconic name "pâté chinois" may have been an invention of Francois Dollier de Casson, who wanted to make fun of La Salle's failed expedition. Members of the expedition were also ironically nicknamed the "Chinese" as they brought with them "chinese" costumes in case they met oriental dignitaries.

Échine Hypothesis 
According to Jean-Marie Francœur, the pâté chinois has for another suggested origin the pâté d'échine de porc, a pâté made of corn, pork loin and turnip. This dish appeared towards the beginnings of New France. At the time, corn and pork loin were common, with potatoes not being available. As such, turnips were taking their place. The name is hypothesised to have changed from échine to Chine and then finally to pâté chinois, with the composition of the pâté also changing with time to switch to potatoes and to use other types of meat.

Cultural references
In the Québécois humorous television program La Petite Vie, pâté chinois is used to show one of the characters' abysmal lack of common sense as she regularly fails to properly prepare it, for example, by laying the three ingredients side by side instead of layering them, or forgetting to mash the potatoes.

See also
 List of pies, tarts and flans

References

 What's Cooking?, "Pate Chinois (French Canadian Shepherd's Pie)" (3 March 2006)

Bibliography 
 Jean-Marie Francœur, La genèse de la cuisine québécoise, Fides, 2011.
 Jean Soulard, 400 ans de gastronomie à Québec, Éditions Communiplex et J. Soulard, 2008.
 Lemasson Jean-Pierre, Le mystère insondable du pâté chinois, Amérik Média editions, October 2009.

Cuisine of Quebec
Canadian cuisine
Tarts
Casserole dishes
Savoury pies